Hopewell is a neighborhood of Louisville, Kentucky located off Old Heady Road along Hopewell Road.  It lies at an elevation of 715 feet (218 m).

References
  

Neighborhoods in Louisville, Kentucky